Charlie Weberg (born 22 May 1998) is a Swedish footballer who plays for Danish 1st Division club HB Køge, on loan from Helsingborgs IF.

Career

Club career
After starting his career in Asmundtorps IF at the age of three, Weberg later moved to Billeberga GIF and Häljarps IF, before joining Helsingborgs IF when he was twelve years old.

He made his senior debut in Helsingborgs IF in a training match against Norwegian club Vålerenga on 23 June 2016. After being given playing time in training matches and in the Swedish Cup, he made his debut in the Superettan against GAIS on 22 April 2017. Just hours before his Superettan debut, Weberg signed his first senior contract with Helsingborg.

In February 2020, Weberg was loaned out to GAIS for the 2020 season. On transfer deadline day, 31 January 2023, Weberg was loaned out to Danish 1st Division club HB Køge until the end of June 2023.

References

External links
Charlie Weberg at Fotbolltransfers

1998 births
Living people
Swedish footballers
Swedish expatriate footballers
Association football defenders
Helsingborgs IF players
GAIS players
HB Køge players
Allsvenskan players
Superettan players
Swedish expatriate sportspeople in Denmark
Expatriate footballers in Denmark